The Re-Up may refer to:
Eminem Presents: The Re-Up, a compilation album by Eminem
Pink Friday: Roman Reloaded – The Re-Up, the reissue of Pink Friday: Roman Reloaded by Nicki Minaj